Gigolette is a 1937 French drama film directed by Yvan Noé and starring Florelle, Gabriel Gabrio and Rosine Deréan.

The film's sets were designed by the art director Jean Douarinou.

Cast
 Florelle as Zélie Vauquelin  
 Gabriel Gabrio as Vauquelin  
 Rosine Deréan as Geneviève de Margemont / Palote Vauquelin  
 Paul Azaïs as Charles  
 Colette Darfeuil as Amandine  
 Jean Servais as Docteur Jacques Bernais  
 Paule Andral 
 Sinoël as Le garçon de café  
 Georges Paulais as L'huissier  
 Charlotte Lysès as Mme de Margemont  
 Fréhel as La chanteuse  
 Pierre Moreno as Gustave de Mauperthuis  
 Rachel Devirys 
 Jacques Berlioz as M. de Margemont  
 Milly Mathis as La concierge  
 Marguerite Moreno as La marquise de Mauperthuis  
 Raymond Cordy as Le coiffeur 
 Jacques Chevalier 
 Hugues de Bagratide 
 Nita Georges 
 Charles Lemontier 
 Michèle Morgan as Une soubrette  
 Jean Neyris 
 Madeleine Pagès 
 André Roanne 
 Suzanne Talba

References

Bibliography 
 Dayna Oscherwitz & MaryEllen Higgins. The A to Z of French Cinema. Scarecrow Press, 2009.

External links 
 

1937 films
French drama films
1937 drama films
1930s French-language films
Films directed by Yvan Noé
French black-and-white films
1930s French films